Jane McKenna (born October 22, 1959) is a politician in Ontario, Canada. She is a Progressive Conservative member of the Legislative Assembly of Ontario from 2011 to 2014 who represented the riding of Burlington and subsequently again from 2018 to 2022. McKenna is currently the Parliamentary Assistant to the Minister of Labour; Chair of the Standing Committee on the Legislative Assembly; and Member of the Standing Committee on Estimates.

Background
McKenna is a lifetime resident of Burlington, Ontario. She worked for an advertising firm and founded her own company called Rainmaker Consulting. She and her ex-husband Tim have five children and two grandchildren.

Politics
In 2010, McKenna ran for the municipal election in Burlington's ward 1 but lost to incumbent Councillor Rick Craven.

McKenna was elected in the 2011 election in the riding of Burlington. She beat Liberal candidate Karmel Sakran by 2,152 votes. While MPP, McKenna served as Critic for the portfolios of Economic Development, Trade & Employment; Government Services and Children and Youth Services.  While Critic for Children and Youth Services, she authored a well-regarded discussion paper, Paths to Prosperity: A Fresh Start for Children and Youth.

McKenna was defeated by Liberal candidate Eleanor McMahon in the 2014 election on June 12, 2014. She supported Patrick Brown in his successful bid to become leader of the Progressive Conservative Party of Ontario.

In December 2016, McKenna won the Progressive Conservative Party of Ontario nomination by a margin of 41 votes for Burlington, her old riding. She represented the PC party successfully in the 2018 Ontario General Election.

In the 2018 Progressive Conservative Party of Ontario leadership election, McKenna supported Caroline Mulroney's unsuccessful bid.

References

External links
 

1959 births
Living people
People from Burlington, Ontario
Progressive Conservative Party of Ontario MPPs
Women MPPs in Ontario
21st-century Canadian politicians
21st-century Canadian women politicians